Elizabeth Henderson Lumpkin (born May 24, 1986) is a former professional tennis player from the United States. She currently serves as the assistant women's tennis coach at the University of Oregon.

Career
Born in Santa Fe, New Mexico, Lumkpin went to Naperville Central High School in Illinois, where she won a record four successive state titles in singles. She was a Junior Fed Cup representative for the United States in 2002.

Lumpkin played collegiate tennis with the UCLA Bruins and was a member of the 2008 championship winning team, before graduating in 2009.

As a professional player, she made both of her WTA Tour main-draw appearances at the Texas Tennis Open, playing doubles in 2011 and 2012. In the 2012 edition, she and partner Yasmin Schnack lost a match tie-break in the first round to eventual champions, Marina Erakovic and Heather Watson.

Lumpkin retired from the tour in 2013.

References

External links
 
 

1986 births
Living people
American female tennis players
Tennis people from Illinois
Sportspeople from Naperville, Illinois
UCLA Bruins women's tennis players